(born January 14, 1981) is a Japanese singer and impressionist connected to the K-Dash-associated office Peach. She is a graduate of Shujitsu High School. While she aimed to become a singer since childhood, she is also trained in piano and enka. In November 2012, she announced she would take a break from singing to recuperate.

Impression repertoire
Christina Aguilera
Aiko
Hiroko Akutsu (Mihimaru GT)
Miki Asakura
Megumi Asaoka
Kim Carnes
Karen Carpenter (The Carpenters)
Chara
Naomi Chiaki
Hitomi Furuya
Miguel Guerreiro
Chitose Hajime
Ayumi Hamasaki
Ayaka Hirahara
Eri Hiramatsu
Kōmi Hirose
Sayuri Ishikawa
Mayumi Itsuwa
Hiromi Iwasaki
Yoshimi Iwasaki
La Toya Jackson
Miliyah Kato
Yuki Katsuragi
Sachiko Kobayashi
Kumi Kōda
Rumiko Koyanagi
Yuki Koyanagi
Lady Gaga
Cyndi Lauper
Bette Midler
Yōko Minamino
Misia
Hibari Misora
Kaori Mochida (Every Little Thing)
Chisato Moritaka
Miyuki Nakajima
Akina Nakamori
Ayumi Nakamura
Rimi Natsukawa
Kana Nishino
Maki Ōguro
Chihiro Onitsuka
Ai Ōtsuka
Diana Ross
Fuyumi Sakamoto
Mayu Sakura
Ringo Sheena
Hiroko Shimabukuro (Speed)
Britney Spears
Yoshimi Tendō
Dionne Warwick
Junko Yagami
Linda Yamamoto
Kumiko Yamashita
Aki Yashiro
Kiyoe Yoshioka (Ikimono-gakari)
Saori Yuki

References

External links
 
Profile
Official blog

1981 births
Japanese impressionists (entertainers)
Living people
People from Okayama
Musicians from Okayama Prefecture
21st-century Japanese singers
21st-century Japanese women singers